Uwe Kamann (born 19 August 1958) is a German politician born in Magdeburg, Saxony-Anhalt. Uwe Kamann has served as a member of the Bundestag from the state of North Rhine-Westphalia since 2017.

Life 
After graduating from secondary school, Kamann completed vocational training as a power plant electronics engineer with the German Federal Railways. From 1989 to 2000 Kamann worked for the IT service company debis Systemhaus. Kamann was on the board of the IT company CSC Ploenzke until 2003 when his contract was not renewed after a strategic reorientation. From May 2004 to the end of 2005, Kamann was managing director of the software company DANET in Weiterstadt. In 2006 Kamann founded the company SEPICON AG. After the 2017 German federal election, Kamann moved into the Bundestag via the North Rhine-Westphalian AfD state list 9. On 17 December 2018 Kamann announced his resignation from the AfD and the AfD parliamentary group in the Bundestag. He justified this with "different views on the political and technical orientations of the party and the parliamentary group”.
Kamann opposes military support for Ukraine.

References

External links 

 Bundestag biography 
 

 

 

1958 births
Living people
Members of the Bundestag for North Rhine-Westphalia
Members of the Bundestag 2017–2021
Members of the Bundestag for the Free Democratic Party (Germany)